is a tower defense video game co-developed by Nintendo and PlatinumGames for the Wii U. The game was bundled as a separate disc for the first print edition of Star Fox Zero during its release in April 2016, and as a digital download code on the Wii U eShop afterwards.

Gameplay
Star Fox Guard is a 3D tower defense game in which players must protect various bases, owned by Slippy Toad's uncle, Grippy, from oncoming attackers by monitoring security cameras. The television displays footage from all of the available security cameras while the Wii U GamePad features an overhead view of the base. To defend the base's core, players must watch the monitors carefully for any oncoming attackers and switch control to one of the available cameras in order to fire its weapon. Enemies are divided into two classes; Combat robots, which must all be defeated in order to progress, and Chaos robots, which hinder the player by tampering with the cameras, such as obscuring the view or showing fake footage. The game features 100 missions and an editor mode that allows players to edit the behavior of enemies in levels and share them online.

Development
Star Fox Guard was announced by series creator Shigeru Miyamoto at E3 2014 as Project Guard. The game was rebranded and renamed as Star Fox Guard during a Nintendo Direct presentation in March 2016.

Reception

Star Fox Guard received mixed to positive reviews, according to review aggregator Metacritic. Jose Otero from IGN praised its "clever enemies", controls, and extra missions, but criticized the "simple campaign" and "bland graphics". Jonathan Harrington from Nintendo Enthusiast praised its gameplay, variety, and online sharing, but criticized the lack of humor, low budget visuals, and music. Stephen Totilo from Kotaku stated that despite it having "just about nothing to do with the aerial shooting gameplay people associate with Star Fox", it was "one of Nintendo's most distinct games in years".

Notes

References

External links
 

2016 video games
Nintendo Entertainment Planning & Development games
Nintendo Network games
PlatinumGames games
Single-player video games
Star Fox video games
Tower defense video games
Video game spin-offs
Video games developed in Japan
Video games produced by Shigeru Miyamoto
Video games that use Amiibo figurines
Wii U eShop games
Wii U games
Wii U-only games